La Vispa Teresa (English: Lively Teresa) is a 1939 Italian, black and white short film directed by Roberto Rossellini. A short nature film, it features a girl catching a butterfly, but is thwarted by other insects.

References

External links

1939 films
1930s Italian-language films
Italian black-and-white films
Italian short films
1930s Italian films